The tornado outbreak and floods of April 28 – May 1, 2017 were a series of severe weather events that affected the central United States, producing life-threatening flooding and a major tornado outbreak. It formed out of a disturbance in the Southwestern United States on April 28, and caused significant impacts, including a heavy snowstorm in the Rockies, and other types of severe weather.

The most significant and damaging events of the storm unfolded late on April 29, when two large, long-tracked, and powerful wedge tornadoes struck areas near Canton, Texas, the strongest being an EF4. Together, the two tornadoes caused four deaths and many injuries.

Meteorological history 
On April 28, a stationary front drifted across the central United States, associated with cloudiness and showers. By 21:00 UTC, a surface low with a central pressure of  developed in central Kansas. Shortly afterwards, thunderstorms erupted along the stationary front, which required the National Weather Service to issue some severe weather watches. A few tornadoes touched down, including an EF2 that caused considerable damage near Cameron, Oklahoma. By April 29, a ridge of high pressure centered over the Atlantic Ocean, this helped focus high levels of atmospheric moisture rising from the Gulf of Mexico along the front, causing immense clusters of heavy rain and thunderstorms to slowly progress eastwards – also known as thunderstorm training. Little change occurred over the next six hours as the front moved slightly eastwards; although a squall line was beginning to form, increasing the threat for large hail, damaging wind gusts and a few tornadoes. While the overall setup was not favorable for a widespread tornado outbreak, thunderstorms from earlier in the day left behind an outflow boundary draped across northeastern Texas, resulting in a localized area of enhanced low-level helicity. Deep moisture, high levels of CAPE, and low LCL heights were also present in this area as multiple thunderstorms rode the boundary and dramatically intensified into large tornadic supercells. A violent EF4 wedge tornado developed near Eustace, Texas and passed west of Canton, leveling homes, debarking numerous trees, and killing two people. Two more people were killed by a separate EF3 wedge tornado that passed east of Canton, destroying a car dealership along Interstate 20, tossing numerous vehicles, destroying homes, and causing significant damage further north in the town of Fruitvale. An EF2 tornado also touched down near Log Cabin and dissipated near Eustace, destroying additional homes and a communications tower. Multiple additional weak tornadoes occurred in Texas and in other states that afternoon and evening as well.

Overnight into the early hours of April 30, the activity pushed eastward and a powerful squall line of severe thunderstorms with numerous embedded tornadic circulations swept through the Mississippi Valley. Throughout the day, the low tracked northeast into the Plains and intensified, causing some snowfall in the mountainous regions and in colder places, meanwhile severe weather continued to occur in the South. Forty-two tornadoes occurred across the Southern United States that afternoon and evening, with much of the activity centered in Mississippi. While many of these tornadoes were weak, some were large and wedge-shaped and reached EF2 intensity. One of these strong tornadoes killed one person and caused damage in the town of Durant, Mississippi.

On May 1, another squall line of severe storms developed further to the north. The Storm Prediction Center ended up issuing a tornado watch for parts of Pennsylvania and New York. The storms ended up producing multiple embedded weak tornadoes across the region. Tornadoes were not the primary threat; however, and straight line wind gusts up to 85 mph (137 km/h) were reported in parts of Pennsylvania and New York which caused a significant amount of damage in the impacted areas. Numerous reports of downed trees and power lines were received throughout parts of the Northeastern United States before the event came to an end.

Confirmed tornadoes

April 28 event

April 29 event

April 30 event

May 1 event

Eustace–Canton, Texas

This violent, rain-wrapped EF4 wedge tornado first touched down south of Eustace at 5:29 pm CDT, prompting a Particularly Dangerous Situation tornado warning. Damage at the beginning of the path ranged from EF0 to EF1 strength, as many trees were snapped and uprooted, a manufactured home sustained minor damage, and a wooden fence was downed. The tornado intensified as it moved northeastward and approached U.S. Route 175, reaching EF2 strength as it passed to the southeast of Eustace. A communications tower was bent in half, a one-story home had most of its roof torn off, while a large two-story brick home had major damage to its roof structure and second floor. Past Route 175, the tornado weakened back to EF1 strength and turned due-north, widening dramatically as it approached the Van Zandt County line. The tornado crossed into Van Zandt County and strengthened back to EF2 intensity at the intersection of County Road 2901 and County Road 2908. Numerous trees were snapped, a house had its roof torn off, a small house lost its roof and sustained collapse of exterior walls, while a third home had a large section of its roof removed. A mobile home was completely destroyed as well in this area. The wedge tornado briefly weakened back to EF1 intensity as it continued northward, before dramatically re-intensifying to EF4 strength as it crossed County Road 2301. A well-built two-story brick home was completely leveled in this area, with much of the foundation slab swept clean of debris. Numerous trees along this segment of the path were denuded and sustained severe debarking. Continuing to move to the north, the tornado weakened to EF3 intensity and reached its peak width: a full mile wide. Numerous metal truss towers were collapsed and mangled along this portion of the path. The tornado maintained EF3 strength as it passed west of Canton, where a house was destroyed and left with only interior rooms standing. The tornado then turned towards the northwest and dissipated to the west of Canton shortly afterwards. Two people were killed and 25 others were injured.

Canton–Fruitvale–Emory, Texas

This destructive EF3 wedge tornado first touched down about 25 miles to the south of Canton, Texas, at 5:41 pm CDT, before it began moving north towards town. The tornado crossed Texas State Highway 19, causing only EF0 damage at this point. By around 6 pm, a Particularly Dangerous Situation tornado warning was issued for Canton, as reports of a large wedge tornado approaching town were received from storm chasers in the local area. Reaching EF1 strength, the tornado completely destroyed The Rustic Barn, a ceremony and wedding venue in this area. 20 people were inside the structure when the tornado hit, though remarkably, no injuries occurred at that location. The tornado then intensified to EF3 strength as it approached Interstate 20 from the south, toppling metal truss towers to the ground. The wedge tornado crossed the interstate, destroying a Dodge dealership and snapping or debarking many trees. Several motorists sought shelter by parking their cars underneath an overhang at the dealership, and survived without injury despite severe damage to their vehicles and the building. However, not all motorists in this area were as fortunate, and one woman was killed as her vehicle was thrown from the interstate into an open field. Several other vehicles were swept from the interstate into a ravine as well. Some cars from the Dodge dealership were found up to half a mile away from where they originated, with their showroom license plates still attached. Several metal self-storage buildings and a restaurant were also heavily damaged in this area, along with the Yesterland Farm amusement park. EF3 damage continued to the north of I-20, and multiple homes and farm structures were destroyed along this segment of the path.

The tornado weakened to EF2 strength as it crossed County Road 1106, but was still causing significant damage as it continued northward towards the town of Fruitvale. By 6:15 pm, the tornado proceeded to strike the western part of Fruitvale, severely damaging homes, downing many trees and power lines, destroying outbuildings, tossing vehicles, and killing farm animals in this area. North of Fruitvale, the tornado maintained EF2 strength as it continued to the north and crossed into Rains County. EF2 damage continued further to the north, and the tornado crossed US 69 to the southeast of Emory. A church and multiple homes sustained major structural damage in this area. One home sustained very high-end EF2 damage and was left with only interior rooms standing. Barns and greenhouses were destroyed as well. The tornado continued to the east of Emory and then weakened to EF1 strength as it approached the Lake Fork Reservoir. The tornado weakened further to EF0 strength as it crossed the reservoir and Highway 514 before dissipating. A total of 2 people were killed and 24 others were injured by this tornado, which was up to a mile wide at times.

The following day, the mayor of the city, Lou Ann Everett declared a need for assistance following the event. She also reported during this speech that "The damage was extensive in the affected area. I have just driven through some of it and it is heartbreaking and upsetting to say the least."

Non-tornadic impacts

Flooding impacts 

According to the NWS, multiple reports of flash flooding had impacted several states, in a range extending from Oklahoma to Missouri.

Late on April 28, a flood watch was issued for a large portion of the Central United States as high moisture clashing with the stationary front was expected to create life-threatening floods, potentially being caused by thunderstorm training. Rainfall totals of up to 11.05 inches (28.07 cm) caused significant damage to property and crops. A large amount of farmland was rendered unusable due to the catastrophic flooding. Farmers had also made plans to plant crops, however, those plans had to be cancelled due to their farmland being flooded.

The flooding has also caused sewage and chemical waste to mix with the rainwater, causing fears of poisoning. Sandbagging efforts have been full-fledged as the Mississippi River continued to rise.

In total, some locations were able to pick up almost  of rainfall during the ordeal. Storm drains were not able to handle the large amounts of rain so a lot of these sewers ended up backing up onto the streets. Many vehicles that attempted to drive through flooded streets were swept away and/or stranded by the floods. Rivers reached moderate to major flood stages in a lot of locations which caused general street closures and severe overflow of rivers. In addition, certain levees were overwhelmed by the large amounts of rain.

Oklahoma 
On April 29, in Oklahoma, the Oklahoma City Fire Department advised residents to stay home due to downed trees and power lines. In addition, multiple portions of interstates, including I-235 and I-40 had to be shut down because of downed power lines and flooding. Lightning ignited a home fire according to news outlets, while a second was reported to have possibly triggered another. As much as 39,000 were reported to have been without power by early on April 29.

Missouri 
Parts of Interstate 44 in Missouri were closed after the interstate began to flood. Route 141 was closed at Interstate 44 well into the week of May 7–13 due to the floodwaters overtopping the low-lying intersection. This was the second occurrence of this thoroughfare's extended closure since December 2015.

Seven levees on the Missouri River were overtopped by water, while another seven levees have been breached altogether. Officials in Missouri continue to warn about potentially contaminated floodwater and advised residents to avoid the water at all costs. The governor of Missouri was forced to declare a state of emergency for all of southern Missouri after the floods began to damage property. Officials estimate that some 200 homes have been affected by the floods near St. Louis and that another 1500 homes could be at risk by the floodwaters. Due to flooding at Busch Stadium, a game between the Saint Louis Cardinals and Cincinnati Reds was postponed.

Arkansas
Officials in Arkansas estimate that close to 1 million acres of farmland have been affected in the state. The University of Arkansas stated that damage totals could be near $64.5 million US dollars. Close to 50 homes have been damaged in Randolph County in Arkansas while 76 residents had to be evacuated due to floodwaters threatening a nursing home. A levee failure in Pocahontas allowed for water to spill into a small town; threatening about 6,500 residents. A total of 108 National Guard members have been deployed in the state for relief. The governor of Arkansas also stated that close to 500 evacuations had already been carried out and that they have 25 vehicles prepared in the case that more evacuations needed to occur.

Louisiana
In Louisiana, a school bus was stranded after attempting to cross a flooded roadway.

Snow impacts 

The same weather system produced heavy snow affected parts of Colorado, Wyoming, Kansas, and Missouri.

On April 28, residents in Denver, Colorado and other major cities began preparing for the storm. Officials were also worried that because of the time of year where most trees were in full bloom, the heavy wet snow might cause branches to break and fall down, possibly causing power outages. In Boulder, where a golf tournament was being held, officials were prepared for possible delays to the tournament. In the end, Denver picked up , with higher amounts in the mountains. At the height of the storm, up to 9,200 were reported to be without power in Pueblo.

The state's Department of Transportation also urged residents to stay off the roadways if necessary. In addition, Highway 16 was shut down in the Bighorn Mountains because of the treacherous conditions.

Blizzard warnings were issued for Kansas and the adjacent areas, as heavy snow and gusty winds were predicted. After the storm subsided, about 100 evacuations and 36 rescues were reported. In the northwestern part of the state,  of Interstate 70 was shut down due to the treacherous conditions.

See also 
December 2015 North American storm complex
Tornado outbreak of April 27–30, 2014
Tornadoes of 2017
Floods in the United States: 2001–present

Notes

References

External links 
 April 29, 2017 East Texas Tornado Event (NWS Fort Worth)

2016–17 North American winter
April 2017 events in the United States
Tornadoes of 2017
2017 in Oklahoma
2017 in Colorado
2017 in Kansas
2017 in Illinois
2017 in Indiana
2017 in Missouri
2017 natural disasters in the United States
Weather events in the United States
2017 floods in the United States